Maiden Alex Ibru, Lady Ibru, MFR, née Thomopulos (born November 20, 1949) is a Nigerian Public Affairs and Communication Consultant, Media Executive and Newspaper Proprietor. She is the Chairman, Publisher, and Chief Executive Officer of Guardian Newspapers. Before becoming the publisher of the Guardian newspaper, she was the CEO of Guardian Press Limited for 11 years. She became the publisher of Guardian newspapers in 1999 after her late husband Alex Ibru died. Maiden also runs the Trinity Foundation which supports civil society organizations that promote democratic and open society values in Nigeria. She was honoured as a Member of the Order of the Federal Republic (MFR) in 2014.

Early life and education 

Maiden Alex Ibru was born in Sapele, Delta State, on Sunday, November 20, 1949. Her father is Mr. Aristotelis Thomopulos who is a Greek man that settled in Nigeria. Her mother is Mrs. Hannah Thomopulos (née Omaghomi) a great-great-granddaughter of Olomu of Koko, the Governor-General of the area in the 1880s. She had elementary education at the Children's Home School, Ibadan. Her secondary education was at Queen's School, Ede.

She proceeded to the University of Ibadan where she got a combined honours degree in English and Theatre studies in 1972. She also attended American University in Washington D.C and obtained a master's degree in Communications and media studies in 1974. She and her late husband Alex Ibru have five children, namely Anita, Ose, Toke, Tive and Uvie. Alex Ibru also has three children from a previous marriage  Sophia, Alexandra, and Annabella.

Career 

Mrs. Maiden Alex-Ibru is the wife of Mr. Alex Ibru. Mr. Ibru was the founder and Chairman of Guardian Press Limited, the holding company that owns Guardian Newspapers Ltd and other associated companies. The Guardian newspaper was set up in 1983. Mr. Alexander Uruemu Ibru died on November 20, 2018. In 2019, Maiden Ibru was appointed the Chairman of Guardian Press Limited. By this appointment, she also became the Publisher and Chief Executive Officer of The Guardian. Before her appointment as publisher and CEO of Guardian Newspapers, she was Chief Executive Officer of Guardian Press Limited for 11 years.

Maiden Alex Ibru is also a director of Trinity Foundation, a philanthropic foundation founded by her late husband Mr. Alexander Ibru. The foundation provides financial and infrastructural support to institutions and civil society organisations which promote democratic and open society principles. It has donated to the Anglican Church in Nigeria, and built an Ecumenical Centre in Agbarha-Otor.

Recognition
In 2007 the Greek Parliament conferred on Maiden Alex Ibru the “Golden Cross of Welfare”, and in 2012 the Orthodox Pope of Alexandria, Egypt and Africa conferred on her the Ladyship title of “The Cross of St. Mark”. In 2014 she was given an award SP(FRN) Special Philanthropy of the Federal Republic of Nigeria, by CECP-(Nig) Committee Encouraging Corporate Philanthropy. In September 2014 she got a National award MFR (Member of the Order of the Federal Republic of Nigeria).

On her 70th birthday, celebrated in November 2019, President Buhari sent her warm greetings, praising her leadership for the Guardian newspaper and her work with the Trinity Foundation. According to President Buhari, Maiden Ibru's outstanding contributions to improving the lives of many, especially the girl-child and underprivileged families, deserved spotlighting and commendation.

See also 
Alex Ibru

References 

1949 births
Living people
Members of the Order of the Federal Republic
Nigerian media executives
Nigerian women in business
Queen's School, Ibadan alumni
University of Ibadan alumni
American University alumni